The Colossus of Rhodes was a statue of the Greek sun-god Helios, erected in the city of Rhodes, on the Greek island of the same name, by Chares of Lindos in 280 BC. One of the Seven Wonders of the Ancient World, it was constructed to celebrate the successful defence of Rhodes city against an attack by Demetrius Poliorcetes, who had besieged it for a year with a large army and navy.

It collapsed during the earthquake of 226 BC, although parts of it were preserved. In accordance with a certain oracle, the Rhodians did not build it again. John Malalas wrote that Hadrian in his reign re-erected the Colossus, but he was mistaken. According to the Suda, the Rhodians were called Colossaeans (Κολοσσαεῖς), because they erected the statue on the island.

In 653, an Arab force under Muslim general Muawiyah I conquered Rhodes, and according to the Chronicle of Theophanes the Confessor, the statue was completely destroyed and the remains sold; this account may be unreliable.

Since 2008, a series of as-yet-unrealized proposals to build a new Colossus at Rhodes Harbour have been announced, although the actual location of the original monument remains in dispute.

Siege of Rhodes

In the early fourth century BC, Rhodes, allied with Ptolemy I of Egypt, prevented a mass invasion staged by their common enemy, Antigonus I Monophthalmus.

In 304 BC a relief force of ships sent by Ptolemy arrived, and Demetrius (son of Antigonus) and his army abandoned the siege, leaving behind most of their siege equipment. To celebrate their victory, the Rhodians sold the equipment left behind for 300 talents and decided to use the money to build a colossal statue of their patron god, Helios. Construction was left to the direction of Chares, a native of Lindos in Rhodes, who had been involved with large-scale statues before. His teacher, the sculptor Lysippos, had constructed a  bronze statue of Zeus at Tarentum.

Construction

Construction began in 292 BC. Ancient accounts, which differ to some degree, describe the structure as being built with iron tie bars to which brass plates were fixed to form the skin. The interior of the structure, which stood on a  white marble pedestal near the Rhodes harbour entrance, was then filled with stone blocks as construction progressed. Other sources place the Colossus on a breakwater in the harbour. Much of the iron and bronze was reforged from the various weapons Demetrius's army left behind, and the abandoned second siege tower may have been used for scaffolding around the lower levels during construction.

Philo of Byzantium wrote in De septem mundi miraculis that Chares created the sculpture in situ by casting it in horizontal courses and then placing "...a huge mound of earth around each section as soon as it was completed, thus burying the finished work under the accumulated earth, and carrying out the casting of the next part on the level."

Modern engineers have put forward a plausible hypothesis for the statue's construction, based on the technology of the time (which was not based on the modern principles of earthquake engineering), and the accounts of Philo and Pliny, who saw and described the ruins.

The base pedestal was said to be at least  in diameter, and either circular or octagonal. The feet were carved in stone and covered with thin bronze plates riveted together. Eight forged iron bars set in a radiating horizontal position formed the ankles and turned up to follow the lines of the legs while becoming progressively smaller. Individually cast curved bronze plates  square with turned-in edges were joined together by rivets through holes formed during casting to form a series of rings.

Archaeologist Ursula Vedder has proposed that the sculpture was cast in large sections following traditional Greek methods and that   Philo's account is "not compatible with the situation proved by archaeology in ancient Greece."

The Standing Colossus (280–226 BC)
After twelve years, in 280 BC, the statue was completed. Preserved in Greek anthologies of poetry is what is believed to be the genuine dedication text for the Colossus.

Collapse (226 BC)

The statue stood for 54 years until a 226 BC earthquake caused significant damage to large portions of Rhodes, including the harbour and commercial buildings, which were destroyed. The statue snapped at the knees and fell over onto land. Ptolemy III offered to pay for the reconstruction of the statue, but the Oracle of Delphi made the Rhodians fear that they had offended Helios, and they declined to rebuild it.

Fallen state (226 BC to 653 AD)
The remains lay on the ground for over 800 years, and even broken, they were so impressive that many travelled to see them.

The remains were described briefly by Strabo (64 or 63 BC – c. 24 AD), in his work Geography (Book XIV, Chapter 2.5). Strabo was a Greek geographer, philosopher, and historian who lived in Asia Minor during the transitional period of the Roman Republic into the Roman Empire.
Strabo is best known for his work Geographica ("Geography"), which presented a descriptive history of people and places from different regions of the world known during his lifetime. Strabo states that:

Pliny the Elder (AD 23/24 – 79) was a Roman author, a naturalist and natural philosopher, a naval and army commander of the early Roman Empire, and a friend of emperor Vespasian. Pliny wrote the encyclopedic Naturalis Historia (Natural History), which became an editorial model for encyclopedias. The Naturalis Historia is one of the largest single works to have survived from the Roman Empire to the modern day and purports to cover the entire field of ancient knowledge. Pliny remarked:

{{quote|text= But that which is by far the most worthy of our admiration, is the colossal statue of the Sun, which stood formerly at Rhodes, and was the work of Chares the Lindian, a pupil of the above-named Lysippus; no less than seventy cubits in height. This statue fifty-six years after it was erected, was thrown down by an earthquake; but even as it lies, it excites our wonder and admiration. Few men can clasp the thumb in their arms, and its fingers are larger than most statues. Where the limbs are broken asunder, vast caverns are seen yawning in the interior. Within it, too, are to be seen large masses of rock, by the weight of which the artist steadied it while erecting it.<ref>Natural History, book 34, Natural History of Metals xviii, 41.</ref>}}

Destruction of the remains
The ultimate fate of the remains of the statue is uncertain. Rhodes has two serious earthquakes per century, owing to its location on the seismically unstable Hellenic Arc. Pausanias tells us, writing ca. 174, how the city was so devastated by an earthquake that the Sibyl oracle foretelling its destruction was considered fulfilled. This means the statue could not have survived for long if it was ever repaired. By the 4th century Rhodes was Christianized, meaning any further maintenance or rebuilding, if there ever was any before, on an ancient pagan statue is unlikely. The metal would have likely been used for coins and maybe also tools by the time of the Arab wars, especially during earlier conflicts such as the Sassanian wars.

The onset of Islamic naval incursions against the Byzantine empire gave rise to a dramatic account of what became of the Colossus. In 653, an Arab force under Muslim general Muawiyah I raided Rhodes, and according to the Chronicle of Theophanes the Confessor, the remains of the statue constituted part of the booty, being melted down and sold to a Jewish merchant of Edessa who loaded the bronze onto 900 camels. The same story is recorded by Bar Hebraeus, writing in Syriac in the 13th century in Edessa (after the Arab pillage of Rhodes): "And a great number of men hauled on strong ropes which were tied around the brass Colossus which was in the city and pulled it down. And they weighed from it three thousand loads of Corinthian brass, and they sold it to a certain Jew from Emesa" (the Syrian city of Homs).

Ultimately, Theophanes is the sole source of this account, and all other sources can be traced to him. As Theophanes' source was Syriac, it may have had vague information about a raid and attributed the statue's demise to it, not knowing much more. Or the Arab destruction and the purported sale to a Jew may have originated as a powerful metaphor for Nebuchadnezzar II's dream of the destruction of a great statue.

Given the likely previous neglect of the remains and various opportunities for authorities to have repurposed the metal, as well as the fact that, Islamic incursions notwithstanding, the island remained an important Byzantine strategic point well into the ninth century, an Arabic raid is unlikely to have found much, if any, remaining metal to carry away. For these reasons, as well as the negative perception of the Arab conquests, L. I. Conrad considers Theophanes' story of the dismantling of the statue as likely propaganda, like the destruction of the Library of Alexandria.

Posture

The harbour-straddling Colossus was a figment of medieval imaginations based on the dedication text's mention of "over land and sea" twice and the writings of an Italian visitor who in 1395 noted that local tradition held that the right foot had stood where the church of St John of the Colossus was then located. Many later illustrations show the statue with one foot on either side of the harbour mouth with ships passing under it. References to this conception are also found in literary works. William Shakespeare's Cassius in Julius Caesar (I, ii, 136–38) says of Caesar:

Shakespeare alludes to the Colossus also in Troilus and Cressida (V.5) and in Henry IV, Part 1 (V.1).

"The New Colossus" (1883), a sonnet by Emma Lazarus written on a cast bronze plaque and mounted inside the pedestal of the Statue of Liberty in 1903, contrasts the latter with:

While these fanciful images feed the misconception, the mechanics of the situation reveal that the Colossus could not have straddled the harbour as described in Lemprière's Classical Dictionary. If the completed statue had straddled the harbour, the entire mouth of the harbour would have been effectively closed during the entirety of the construction, and the ancient Rhodians did not have the means to dredge and re-open the harbour after construction. Also, the fallen statue would have blocked the harbour, and since the ancient Rhodians did not have the ability to remove the fallen statue from the harbour, it would not have remained visible on land for the next 800 years, as discussed above. Even neglecting these objections, the statue was made of bronze, and engineering analyses indicate that it could not have been built with its legs apart without collapsing under its own weight. 

Many researchers have considered alternative positions for the statue which would have made it more feasible for actual construction by the ancients. There is also no evidence that the statue held a torch aloft; the records simply say that after completion, the Rhodians kindled the "torch of freedom". A relief in a nearby temple shows Helios standing with one hand shielding his eyes, similar to the way a person shields their eyes when looking toward the sun, and it is quite possible that the colossus was constructed in the same pose.

While scholars do not know what the statue looked like, they do have a good idea of what the head and face looked like, as it was of a standard rendering at the time. The head would have had curly hair with evenly spaced spikes of bronze or silver flame radiating, similar to the images found on contemporary Rhodian coins.

Possible locations

While scholars generally agree that anecdotal depictions of the Colossus straddling the harbour's entry point have no historic or scientific basis, the monument's actual location remains a matter of debate. As mentioned above the statue is thought locally to have stood where two pillars now stand at the Mandraki port entrance.

The floor of the Fortress of St Nicholas, near the harbour entrance, contains a circle of sandstone blocks of unknown origin or purpose. Curved blocks of marble that were incorporated into the Fortress structure, but are considered too intricately cut to have been quarried for that purpose, have been posited as the remnants of a marble base for the Colossus, which would have stood on the sandstone block foundation.

Archaeologist Ursula Vedder postulates that the Colossus was not located in the harbour area at all, but rather was part of the Acropolis of Rhodes, which stood on a hill that overlooks the port area. The ruins of a large temple, traditionally thought to have been dedicated to Apollo, are situated at the highest point of the hill. Vedder believes that the structure would actually have been a Helios sanctuary, and a portion of its enormous stone foundation could have served as the supporting platform for the Colossus.

Modern Colossus projects
In 2008, The Guardian reported that a modern Colossus was to be built at the harbour entrance by the German artist Gert Hof leading a Cologne-based team. It was to be a giant light sculpture made partially out of melted-down weapons from around the world. It would cost up to €200 million.

In December 2015, a group of European architects announced plans to build a modern Colossus bestriding two piers at the harbour entrance, despite a preponderance of evidence and scholarly opinion that the original monument could not have stood there. The statue would include a cultural centre, a library, an exhibition hall, and a lighthouse, all powered by solar panels. , no such plans have been carried out and the website for the project is offline.

See also
Twelve Metal Colossi
The Colossus of Rhodes (Dalí)The New ColossusThe Rhodes ColossusList of tallest statues
List of tallest structures built before the 20th century

References
Notes

References

Sources
 
 Gabriel, Albert. Bulletin de Correspondance Hellenique 56 (1932), pp. 331–59.
 Haynes, D.E.L. "Philo of Byzantium and the Colossus of Rhodes" The Journal of Hellenic Studies 77.2 (1957), pp. 311–312. A response to Maryon.
 Maryon, Herbert, "The Colossus of Rhodes" in The Journal of Hellenic Studies 76 (1956), pp. 68–86. A sculptor's speculations on the Colossus of Rhodes.

Further reading

Jones, Kenneth R. 2014. "Alcaeus of Messene, Philip V and the Colossus of Rhodes: A Re-Examination of Anth. Pal. 6.171." The Classical Quarterly 64, no. 1: 136–51. doi:10.1017/S0009838813000591.
Romer, John., and Elizabeth Romer. 1995. The Seven Wonders of the World: A History of the Modern Imagination. 1st American ed. New York: Henry Holt.
Woods, David. 2016. "On the Alleged Arab Destruction of the Colossus of Rhodes c. 653." Byzantion: Revue Internationale Des Etudes Byzantines'' 86: 441–51.

 
Ancient Rhodes
Demolished buildings and structures in Greece
Seven Wonders of the Ancient World
Ancient Greece in art and culture
Hellenistic architecture
Hellenistic and Roman bronzes
Lost sculptures
Culture of Rhodes
Helios
Ancient Greek metalwork
Buildings and structures in Rhodes (city)
3rd-century BC religious buildings and structures
Buildings and structures completed in the 3rd century BC
Buildings and structures demolished in the 3rd century BC
3rd-century BC establishments
3rd-century BC disestablishments
Ancient Greek and Roman colossal statues